Akhisarspor Kulübü (Akhisar Sports Club), commonly known as Akhisarspor, is a Turkish professional football club located in the city of Akhisar. Formed in 1970, Akhisarspor are nicknamed Akigo. The club has a fierce rivalry with Turgutluspor and Manisaspor.

Akhisarspor had their first major success in 2012 when they won the TFF First League and as a result were promoted to the Süper Lig. On 10 May 2018, Akhisarspor won their first professional trophy, the 2017–18 Turkish Cup. On 5 August 2018, they won the Turkish Super Cup by beating Galatasaray on penalties.

History
Akhisarspor was founded in 1970 by the merger of three football teams, Güneşspor, Gençlikspor and Doğanspor in Manisa. Yılmaz Atabarut was the founder and the first president of Akhisar Belediyespor.

The club competed in the Turkish regional amateur series until 1984, when it was promoted to the TFF Third League, the fourth level in the Turkish football league system. Ten years later, in 1994, they were relegated back to the regional amateur league for one season.

In 1995, Akhisarspor was promoted back to the third league. In the 2000–2001 season, they advanced to the TFF Second League and after nine years there, they were promoted to the TFF First League. They became the champion of the league in their second season which brought them to the highest level of  Turkish football, the Süper Lig.

In 2012, Akhisarspor brought in Bruno Mezenga, Çağdaş Atan and Ibrahima Sonko to strengthen their squad. In January 2013, they signed Greek striker Theofanis "Fanis" Gekas who went on to score 12 goals for the remainder of the 2012–13 season, and assisted in the effort to keep the club in the division. Akhisarspor ended on a 14th place in the Süper Lig.

In the 2016–17 season, Akhisarspor finished in 7th place on the table, which is the highest position they've been in throughout their history.

On 10 May 2018, Akhisarspor won the Turkish Cup, their first title in their history. This qualified them to the UEFA Europa League for the first time.

Stadium

Akhisarspor played at the Akhisar Şehir Stadium before being promoted to the Süper Lig in 2012. However, the Akhisar Şehir Stadium was not fit for the standards of the league. Consequently, the club had to ground-share with Manisaspor and use the Manisa 19 Mayis Stadium from 2012 to 2017. The stadium was officially opened in 1974 and was renovated in 2008.

In 2014, the construction of Akhisarspor's new and very own stadium was started. It is called the Spor Toto Akhisar Stadium, and is located in Akhisar.

Stadium history

Colours and crest

Colours
The official colours of Akhisarspor are green and black, but the team also use the yellow colour. These three colours represent Güneşspor, Gençlikspor and Doğanspor, respectively. As a fourth colour, the club uses white. Nike has been the kit manufacturer of the team since 2012.

Crest
On the crest of the team you can again find the three colours of Akhisarspor. On the crest you can see a ball with wings. The ball is white coloured and the wings are yellow coloured. Above and under the ball you can read the words 'Akhisar' in green and 'Spor' with a black background. Under Spor, we can read '1970' also in black.

League participations
Süper Lig: 2012–2019
1. Lig: 2010–2012, 2019–2021
2. Lig: 2008–2010, 2021–2022
3. Lig: 1984–1994, 1995–2008, 2022–
Amateur Level: 1970–1984, 1994–1995

Recent seasons

Honours

Domestic

League
TFF First League
Winners (1): 2011–12
TFF Second League
Runners-up (1): 2009–10
TFF Third League
Runners-up (1): 2007–08

Cups
Turkish Cup
Winners (1): 2017–18
Runners-up (1): 2018–19
Turkish Super Cup
Winners (1): 2018
Runners-up (1): 2019

European record

P = Matches played; W = Matches won; D = Matches drawn; L = Matches lost; GF = Goals for; GA = Goals against; GD = Goals difference.

List of matches
Note: Akhisar score always listed first.

UEFA ranking history:

Players

Current squad

Other players under contract

Personnel

Notable managers

References

External links
Akhisarspor on TFF.org

 
Sport in Manisa
Akhisar Belediyespor
Association football clubs established in 1970
1970 establishments in Turkey
Süper Lig clubs